These page shows the results of the Beach volleyball World Championships, held 21–26 June 2005 in Berlin, Germany. It was the fifth official edition of this event, after ten unofficial championships (1987–1996) all held in Rio de Janeiro.

Men's competition

Final ranking

Women's competition

Final ranking

References
 Beach Volleyball Results

External links
Official site for the Swatch FIVB World Championships 2005

2005
W
B
B